Eva Janko (née Egger) (born 24 January 1945 in Floing, Styria) is a former javelin thrower from Austria. She is the mother of the Austria national football team player Marc Janko.

She won the bronze medal in javelin throw at the 1968 Summer Olympics held in Mexico City, Mexico.

Her personal best throw of 61,80 metres, achieved in July 1973 in Innsbruck, is still the Austrian record.

References

External links 
 
 

1945 births
Living people
People from Weiz District
Austrian female javelin throwers
Olympic bronze medalists for Austria
Athletes (track and field) at the 1968 Summer Olympics
Athletes (track and field) at the 1972 Summer Olympics
Athletes (track and field) at the 1976 Summer Olympics
Olympic athletes of Austria
Medalists at the 1968 Summer Olympics
Olympic bronze medalists in athletics (track and field)
Sportspeople from Styria
20th-century Austrian women
21st-century Austrian women